Cary is an unincorporated community in Monroe Township, Putnam County, in the U.S. state of Indiana.

Geography

References

Unincorporated communities in Putnam County, Indiana
Unincorporated communities in Indiana